Sawatvilay Phimmasone (born March 3, 1987) is a Laotian taekwondo practitioner. He won a surprising bronze medal  in the men's lightweight (-72 kg) class at the 2008 Asian Taekwondo Championships, upsetting two-time Olympic medalist Song Myeong-Seob of South Korea in the first round.

External links
Profile from Taekwondo Data

1987 births
Living people
Laotian male taekwondo practitioners
Place of birth missing (living people)
Taekwondo practitioners at the 2006 Asian Games
Taekwondo practitioners at the 2010 Asian Games
Southeast Asian Games medalists for Laos
Southeast Asian Games medalists in taekwondo
Competitors at the 2005 Southeast Asian Games
Asian Games competitors for Laos
Asian Taekwondo Championships medalists